The Billboard Hot 100 is a chart that ranks the best-performing singles of the United States. Published by Billboard magazine, the data are compiled by Nielsen SoundScan based collectively on each single's weekly physical and digital sales, and airplay. There were 17 total number-one singles in 2010.

In 2010, nine acts gained their first U.S. number-one single either as a lead or featured act: Kesha, Taio Cruz, B.o.B, Bruno Mars, will.i.am, Far East Movement, The Cataracs, Dev, and Drake.

Rihanna earned four number-one singles during the year — three as a solo artist and one as featured guest on Eminem's "Love the Way You Lie" — the first time a female artist has achieved this accomplishment in a single calendar year. She also became the female artist with the fifth most number-one singles, scoring her sixth, seventh, eighth, and ninth number-one singles during the year. Katy Perry, Eminem, Kesha, and Bruno Mars also each scored multiple number-one singles during the year, with Katy Perry scoring three consecutive number-one singles — a feat last done by R&B singer Monica eleven years earlier.

Usher became the first artist to score number-one singles in the 1990s, 2000s, and 2010s when his song "OMG" reached number one, becoming his ninth number-one single. Kesha's "Tik Tok" was the longest-running number-one single of the year with nine consecutive weeks at the top — the longest run for a debut single by a female artist since 1977. Two singles debuted at the top of the chart this year: Eminem's "Not Afraid" and Kesha's "We R Who We R," becoming the sixteenth and seventeenth singles in the chart's 52-year history to debut at number one.

Chart history

Number-one artists

See also
2010 in music
Billboard Year-End Hot 100 singles of 2010
List of Billboard number-one singles
List of Billboard Hot 100 top 10 singles in 2010
List of Hot 100 number-one singles of the 2010s (U.S.)

References

External links
Current Hot 100 Chart

United States Hot 100
2010
Hot 100 number-one singles